Fit for a King is a 1937 American film starring Joe E. Brown and directed by Edward Sedgwick.

Plot summary
Newspaper reporter "Scoops" (Brown) is sent out on assignment, to investigate the failed assassination attempts on Archduke Julio (Harry Davenport).

Trying to get the story, he runs into Jane Hamilton (Helen Mack) who is really Princess Helen. He doesn't realize that she is the story: a princess in exile, in danger of assassination; and, falling in love with "Scoops", while engaged to a prince.

The film ends with a wild chase and a shootout with machine guns. The question is, who will survive to tell the tale?

Cast
Joe E. Brown as Virgil Ambrose Jeremiah Christopher 'Scoop' Jones
Helen Mack as Jane Hamilton / Princess Helen
Paul Kelly as Briggs
Harry Davenport as Archduke Julio
Halliwell Hobbes as Count Strunsky
John Qualen as Otto
Donald Briggs as Prince Michael
Frank Reicher as Kurtz
Russell Hicks as Editor Hardwick
Charles Trowbridge as Mr. Marshall

Soundtrack

References

External links

1937 films
1930s English-language films
American black-and-white films
1937 romantic comedy films
Films directed by Edward Sedgwick
RKO Pictures films
American romantic comedy films
Films produced by David L. Loew
Films about princesses
Films set in a fictional country
1930s American films